The German Indoor Combined Events Championships is an annual combined track and field events competition which serves as a national indoor championship for Germany.

The competition was established in 2003 by the German Athletics Association and is organised by various regional associations at different locations from year to year. The competition consists of men's heptathlon and women's pentathlon, with three separate age categories: senior, under-20, and under-18.

Prior to the competition's establishment, German national championships in combined events were awarded in West Germany in 1973 to 1975, while those in the East had a more established tradition with a combined events title being awarded within the East German Indoor Athletics Championships from 1971 to its final edition in 1990. The East German events were held on over-sized indoor tracks and the men's event varied, starting as a pentathlon in 1974 until a switch to heptathlon in 1981 and briefly being held as an octathlon from 1987 to 1989. The edition numbering of the East German Athletics Federation's event was inconsistent, with the exclusion of annual championships not held in the regular venue in Senftenberg.

Editions

German Championships

West German Championships

East German Championships

Champions

German Championships

West German Championships

East German Championships

See also 
 List of German records in athletics

References

Results
 Die Deutschen Leichtathletik-Meister seit 1995
 Deutsche Hallen – Leichtathletik – Meisterschaften (Siebenkampf – Herren) (1973–1975). sport-komplett.de
 Leichtathletik – DDR – Hallen – Meisterschaften (Fünfkampf-Siebenkampf-Achtkampf – Herren). sport-komplett.de
 Leichtathletik – DDR – Hallen – Meisterschaften (Fünfkampf – Damen). sport-komplett.de

 
Athletics competitions in Germany
National indoor athletics competitions
Recurring sporting events established in 2003
2003 establishments in Germany
February sporting events
Athletics Indoor